Iranian mythology or Iranic mythology may refer to any of the following mythologies of various Iranian peoples:

 Persian mythology
 Kurdish mythology
 Scythian mythology
 Ossetian mythology
 Azerbaijani mythology

See also
Iranian religions
Proto-Indo-Iranian religion
Ancient Iranian religion

 
Indo-European mythology
Iranic culture